The Big Shave is a 1967 six-minute body horror short film directed by Martin Scorsese. It is also known as Viet '67.

Home media
In May 2020, it was made available on DVD/Blu-ray by The Criterion Collection as part of a collection of his short films from the 60s and 70s.

Synopsis
Peter Bernuth stars as the recipient of the title shave, repeatedly shaving away hair, then skin, in an increasingly bloody and graphic bathroom scene. Many film critics have interpreted the young man's process of self-mutilation as a metaphor for the self-destructive involvement of the United States in the Vietnam War, prompted by the film's alternative title.

Production
The music accompanying the film is Bunny Berigan's "I Can't Get Started". The film was produced at New York University's Tisch School of the Arts, shot on Afga color film donated by Palais des Beaux Arts.

The short's use of violence, music and montage would become trademarks of Scorsese's future work.

Cultural references
Cutting Moments (1997) has a scene which greatly resembles "The Big Shave".
American Dad!: In "The Best Christmas Story Never", Stan travels back in time to 1970 and meets a young Martin Scorsese. When Stan tells the director that he's a big fan, Scorsese says, incredulously, "You saw my six minute film about a guy shaving?!"
Dave Hause, singer of The Loved Ones, released a video for the song "Time Will Tell" from his debut solo album Resolutions that pays homage to "The Big Shave".
PEARLIES A two-minute short horror film directed by Jonathan Gularte Ramirez starring as himself as he brushes his teeth in an increasingly bloody and graphic fashion. The short is directly inspired from "The Big Shave".

See also
List of American films of 1967
Counterculture of the 1960s
Experimental film

References

External links
 
 The short on Internet Archive
Criterion article about the early shorts including The Big Shave

1960s avant-garde and experimental films
1967 short films
Films without speech
Short films directed by Martin Scorsese
American short films
Self-harm in fiction
American student films
1960s English-language films